Fido refers to:

Dogs

 Fido (dog), a famous dog and symbol of loyalty
 Fido (Lincoln dog), favorite dog of Abraham Lincoln

Art, entertainment, and media

Fictional characters
 Fido Dido, a cartoon character associated with the soft drink 7 Up
 Fidough, a Pokémon species

Film
 Fido (film), a Canadian comedy about a zombie named "Fido"

Music
 Fido (band), a punk/rock band from Melbourne, Australia
 Fido, one half of Alexis & Fido, a reggaeton duo

Visual art
 Fairfield Industrial Dog Object, or Fido, a sculpture in Fairfield, Victoria, Australia

People
 Beata Fido (born 1967), Polish actress

Internet and communication
 FIDO Alliance, an industry consortium working on internet authentication mechanisms, including the U2F protocol for two-factor authentication.
 Fido Solutions, a Canadian cellular, home phone and Internet provider
 FidoNet, a worldwide bulletin board system computer network, related to the FIDO bulletin board software package.
 A microcontroller version of the Freescale ColdFire (part of the Motorola 68000 series)
 .fido a type of Cineon Graphics Data file format.

Military and space

 Fido Explosives Detector, a portable explosives detector
 Fire Direction Officer or FDO, the third ranking officer in a US artillery battery
 Flight Dynamics Officer, a position in ground control of space missions
 Fog Investigation and Dispersal Operation, a fog dispersal system developed in the Second World War
 Mark 24 Mine or FIDO, a U.S. acoustic homing torpedo used during World War II
 Roger Grosjean, an MI5 double agent (codename Fido) in World War II

See also